Satellite Award for Best Supporting Actor may refer to:

Satellite Award for Best Supporting Actor – Motion Picture or
Satellite Award for Best Supporting Actor – Series, Miniseries or Television Film
Satellite Award for Best Supporting Actor – Television Series (2002–2006)